QPF may refer to:

 Quantitative precipitation forecast
 Quebec Police Force, the Sûreté du Québec
 Queensland Poetry Festival